Torrecuso is a comune (municipality) in the Province of Benevento in the Italian region Campania, located about 50 km northeast of Naples and about 10 km northwest of Benevento.

Torrecuso borders the following municipalities: Benevento, Foglianise, Fragneto Monforte, Paupisi, Ponte, Vitulano.

References

External links
 Official website

Cities and towns in Campania